De Beer's Pass is located in the Eastern Cape province of South Africa.  It is situated on an unmarked road between Cookhouse and Tarkastad.

This pass should not be confused with another pass of the same name located in South Africa's KwaZulu-Natal province.

Mountain passes of the Eastern Cape